The Milner Baronetcy, of Nun Appleton Hall in the County of York. It is a title in the Baronetage of Great Britain.

It was created on 26 February 1717 for William Milner, later Member of Parliament for York and Grand Master of the Freemasons. He was the son of William Milner (b.1662) Mayor of Leeds and his wife Mary, née Ibbetson.

The second Baronet was Receiver-General of Excise and High Sheriff of Yorkshire. The third and fifth Baronets both represented York in the House of Commons, while the fourth served as High Sheriff.

The seventh Baronet succeeded his brother who died young: he was Member of Parliament for York and Bassetlaw and joined the Privy Council in 1900. The eighth baronet was an architect with Milner and Craze.

George Francis Milner, son of Henry Beilby William Milner, second son of the fourth Baronet, was a Brigadier-General in the British Army. His son was the ninth Baronet. He relocated the family to South Africa, where the 10th Baronet now lives.

Milner baronets, of Nun Appleton Hall (1717)

Sir William Milner, 1st Baronet (–1745)
Sir William Milner, 2nd Baronet (–1774)
Sir William Mordaunt Milner, 3rd Baronet (1754–1811)
Sir William Mordaunt Sturt Milner, 4th Baronet (1779–1855)
Sir William Mordaunt Edward Milner, 5th Baronet (1820–1867)
Sir William Mordaunt Milner, 6th Baronet (1848–1880)
Sir Frederick George Milner, 7th Baronet (1849–1931)
Sir William Frederick Victor Mordaunt Milner, 8th Baronet (1893–1960)
Sir George Edward Mordaunt Milner, 9th Baronet (1911–1995)
Sir Timothy William Lycett Milner, 10th Baronet (born 1936)

The heir presumptive is the current holder's nephew, Marcus Charles Mordaunt Miller (born 1968).

References

Kidd, Charles, Williamson, David (editors). Debrett's Peerage and Baronetage (1990 edition). New York: St Martin's Press, 1990.

Baronetcies in the Baronetage of Great Britain
1717 establishments in Great Britain